The Finow Canal (German Finowkanal) is one of the oldest artificial waterways in Europe. It was built for the first time in 1605 and connects the Oder and Havel rivers. The Ragöse river flows into the canal.
 
After completion of the straighter Oder–Havel Canal in 1914, the economic relevance of the Finow Canal decreased. Today it is mainly used for tourism. The Experimental Radio Station Eberswalde is also at the Finow Canal.

References 

Canals in Brandenburg
Eberswalde
Federal waterways in Germany
Canals opened in 1605
1605 establishments in the Holy Roman Empire
CFinow